Centuripe (Latin: Centuripae; Sicilian: Centorbi) is a town and comune in the province of Enna (Sicily, southern Italy).

The economy is mostly based on agriculture. There are caves for sulphur and salt mineral, and water springs.

History

Thucydides mentions Kentoripa (Κεντόριπα) as a city of the Sicels, Hellenized in the 5th century BC. It became an ally of the Athenians at the time of their expedition against Syracuse, and maintained its independence almost uninterruptedly (though it fell under the power of Agathocles) until the First Punic War when it immediately submitted to the Romans.

In the 3rd and 2nd centuries BC Centuripe Ware was a distinctive class of Sicilian vase painting, with the unusual feature of fully coloured painting in tempera applied after firing was complete.

Cicero described it, perhaps with some exaggeration, as being by far the largest and richest city of Sicily, and as having a population of 10,000, engaged in the cultivation of an extensive territory. It appears to have suffered much in the war against Sextus Pompeius because of its loyalty to Octavian, but Octavian reconstructed and gave the inhabitants Roman citizenship.

The Imperial Roman age has left the most impressive monumental remains. Grandiose monumental ruins, a rich complex of sculptures, numerous inscriptions: a whole series of elements seem to mark the accomplishments of a local family that, in the 2nd century, came to express a consul, a son of one of the components of the entourage of the emperor Hadrian. A large number of monumental remains were lost forever due to the neglect of the past and systematic theft and plundering for collectors and collections of every where. It gradually declined in the late Empire.

Emperor Frederick II entirely destroyed the city in 1233 in punishment for its rebellion, the inhabitants deported to Augusta. King Charles I of Anjou razed it completely to the ground, and the city was rebuilt only in 1548 by Francesco I Moncada, the future Prince of Paternò.

The city was known as Centorbi until 1863. In 1943 during World War II and the liberation of Sicily the Battle of Centuripe saw the town captured spectacularly from the defending Germans by the 38th (Irish) Infantry Brigade although it suffered some damage.

Main monuments

Many remains of the ancient city, mostly of the Roman period, still exist and numerous antiquities, including some fine Hellenistic terra-cottas, were discovered in casual excavations.

Other sights include the Chiesa Madre (17th century) and the ruins of the so-called Castle of Conradin, in fact a Roman mausoleum of the Imperial age.

Archaeological sites

Centuripe and the surrounding territory are the subject of archaeological research and numerous sites have been found:

Amara Water Zone: Thermal remains of the Hellenistic- Roman age
Sorgiva Bagni: Roman spa remains
District Agliastrello: remains of a town
District Bagni: (to the north) Hellenistic necropolis
District Casino: Necropolis from the Iron Age, with stone circle tombs, with multiple burials; used until the Hellenistic age
District Cuba in Muglia: Prehistoric settlement and necropolis from the Neolithic age to the Ancient Bronze age
District Difesa: Large ceramic kilns
District Piano Pozzi: Remains of inhabited area (south-east) Hellenistic necropolis
District Biliuzzo: Hellenistic necropolis
Carcaci hamlet: rock necropolis; remains of the Bronze Age; Roman age structures
Castellaccio: Hellenistic furnace; remains of a medieval castle
Corradino Castle: Roman Mausoleum
Monte Calvario: Remains of town
Castiglione collection: Embankment wall
Fondo Testai: ancient cistern
Vallone Gelso: remains of inhabited areas, necropolis from the 8th century BC to the Hellenistic period
Monte Porcello: Remains of Greek-Hellenistic settlement
Mulino Barbagallo: monumental complex (ancient seat of the "Augustali") with marble statues of Augustus, Drusus, etc.
Panneria: Roman house
Piano Capitano: Extensive necropolis from the 8th century BC to the Hellenistic period
Road Catenanuova to Centuripe: ancient furnace
Road of Panaria: House of the masks and remains of inhabited areas
Vallone Defesa: location of the ancient gymnasium

In the city centre:

Hellenistic-Roman centre with walls, inhabited area and furnaces.
Chiesa del Crocifisso: Hellenistic-Roman structures with mosaic "ancient rooms"
La Dogana: Fountain-cistern of the Roman-imperial age

Ruins, walls and remains of buildings near the churches

Chiesa del Crocifisso: embankment wall
Church of the Maddalena: ancient wall
Church of Santa Maria delle Grazie: ancient wall
Mother Church: ruins
Addolorata Church: ancient remains
Colle dell'Annunziata
Convent of Sant'Agostino: Ruins
Fondo Calcerano: Ancient building
The Ancient Stables
Via Fragalà: ancient rooms
Via Scipione: remains of a village

Roman bridge

Roman Centuripe was on an important route, the via frumentaria that connected Catania to the Tyrrhenian coast along the Simeto river; it joined Aetna (Paternò), Centuripe, Agyrium (Agira), Assorum (Assoro), Henna (Enna) and continued up to Termini Imerese. The strategic position of the city allowed the control both of this road and of that from the North continuing towards Leontini.

The discovery of a paved stretch of road along the Simeto river and some ruined sections of the destroyed Roman Bridge of Centuripe, forgotten for centuries due to a deviation of the river, have advanced the hypothesis of finding the via frumentaria to some scholars. The bridge is located near the Ponte Barca of Biancavilla and consists of four large segments aligned in the WNW/ESE direction, of a width of about 3 m and a length of 6–8 m each. The monument dates from the second century, probably linked to Quintus Pompeius Sosius Falco, curator of the viae Traianae between 108 and 112.

The Askos of Centuripe

In the 1820s an askos (flattened vase) dating to the first half of the 5th century BC was found (now in the archaeological museum of Karlsruhe) with the longest Sicel inscription found to date.

The Archaeological Regional Museum of Centuripe 
In the town of Centuripe is the Regional Archaeological Museum of Centuripe, the museum contains the largest collection of Roman finds in central Sicily and important and rare statues of the emperors Hadrian and Augustus.

Twin towns
 Lanuvio, Italy

References

External links

Municipalities of the Province of Enna
5th-century BC establishments in Italy
Archaeological sites in Sicily